The 2016–17 Croatian Football Cup was the twenty-sixth season of Croatia's football knockout competition. The defending champions were Dinamo Zagreb, having won their 14th title the previous year by defeating Slaven Belupo in the final.

Calendar

Source:

Participating clubs
The following 48 teams qualified for the competition:

Preliminary round
The draw for the preliminary single-legged round was held on 3 August 2016 in Zagreb. The matches were played over four days, 20–24 August 2016.

* Matches were played on 20 August.** Matches were played on 23 August.

First round
First round consisted of 16 single-leg matches, with 16 winners from the preliminary round joined by 16 clubs with the highest cup coefficients. The matches were played over two days, 20–21 September 2016.

* Matches were played on 20 September.

Second round
Second round consisted of eight single-legged ties, with 16 winners from the first round. The pairings were determined by cup coefficients. The matches were played on 26 October 2016.

* Matches played on 25 October.

Quarter-final
Quarter-final consisted of four single-legged ties and included 8 winners from the second round. The pairings were determined by cup coefficients. The matches were played on 30 November 2016.

* Match played on 29 November.

Semi-final 
Semi-final consisted of two two-legged ties and included 4 winners from the quarter-final. The first leg was played 1 March 2017 and the return leg on 15 March 2017.

First legs

Second legs

Final 

The final was played on 31 May 2017 at Stadion Varteks in Varaždin.

Bracket

Top scorers

References

External links
Official website 

Croatian Football Cup seasons
Croatia
Croatian Cup, 2014-15